Oliver Arblaster (born 5 May 2004) is an English professional footballer who plays as a midfielder for Sheffield United.

Career
Arblaster made his professional debut starting in an EFL Cup match as Sheffield United played West Bromwich Albion at The Hawthorns on 11 August 2022.

International career
In November 2021 Arblaster was called up to the England under-18 squad for the first time and made his debut against  Belgium under-18s.

Career statistics

References

External links
 

Living people
2004 births
Sheffield United F.C. players
English footballers
Footballers from Sheffield
Footballers from Yorkshire